General Berkeley may refer to:

George Berkeley (British Army officer) (1785–1857), British Army general
Henry Berkeley (British Army officer) (after 1682–1736), British Army brigadier general
James P. Berkeley (1907–1995), U.S. Marine Corps lieutenant general
Randolph C. Berkeley (1875–1960), U.S. Marine Corps major general